The Antwerp Smerle is a breed of fancy pigeon developed over many years of selective breeding. Antwerp Smerles, along with other varieties of domesticated pigeons, are all descendants from the rock pigeon (Columba livia). The Smerle was one of the breeds used in the development of the Racing Homer.

References

See also 
List of pigeon breeds
Antwerp Smerle Breed Guide - Pigeonpedia

Pigeon breeds
Pigeon breeds originating in Belgium